Cow Hell Swamp (also called Cow Hell) is a swamp in the U.S. state of Georgia. The swamp is located along the eastern bank of the Oconee river near the mouth of Buckeye creek in northern Laurens County, with a small portion of the swamp extending north into the southern portion of Johnson County. Cow Hell Swamp is on the opposite side of the Oconee river from Beaverdam Swamp, which is located on the western bank of the Oconee river.

The swamp was named Cow Hell by nearby residents due to the fact that cattle that ventured into the swamp from nearby farms would frequently get stuck in the bogs.

Cow Hell Swamp is a dense bottomland hardwood forest swamp filled with a large number of bald cypress trees. The nests of birds such as Eastern phoebes are often found in the swamp and its surrounding areas. The swamp is often visited via kayaking, which is done through the swamp via the Oconee river.

The United States Geological Survey (USGS) mapping quadrangle that the swamp is contained in is also named Cow Hell Swamp, and includes parts of nearby Wilkinson and Johnson counties.

In the early 20th century, badly decomposed human remains were found in the swamp after a nearby farmer went missing while herding cows. The remains were unable to be identified and were buried in a nearby grave.

References

Swamps of Georgia (U.S. state)
Bodies of water of Johnson County, Georgia
Bodies of water of Laurens County, Georgia
Bodies of water of Wilkinson County, Georgia